Tank top may refer to:

 Tank top (shirt), a type of sleeveless shirt (US/Australian/Canadian English)
 Tank top (sweater), also known as a sweater vest